Leonard Ong (born 9 December 1992) is a Singaporean sailor. He was placed 34th in the men's RS:X event at the 2016 Summer Olympics and was the first male windsurfer to represent the republic in 32 years.

References

External links
 
 
 
 

1992 births
Living people
Singaporean windsurfers
Singaporean male sailors (sport)
Olympic sailors of Singapore
Sailors at the 2016 Summer Olympics – RS:X
Asian Games competitors for Singapore
Sailors at the 2010 Asian Games
Sailors at the 2014 Asian Games
Southeast Asian Games bronze medalists for Singapore
Southeast Asian Games medalists in sailing
Competitors at the 2011 Southeast Asian Games